Montrose, Queensland may refer:

 Montrose, Queensland (Southern Downs Region)
 Montrose, Queensland (Western Downs Region)